Andrés Eduardo Pérez (born 9 September 1980) is a Colombian football midfielder, who currently plays for Independiente Santa Fe in the Categoría Primera A.

External links

1980 births
Living people
Footballers from Bogotá
Colombian footballers
Colombian expatriate footballers
Colombia international footballers
Association football midfielders
Real Cartagena footballers
Millonarios F.C. players
Quilmes Atlético Club footballers
San Lorenzo de Almagro footballers
Arsenal de Sarandí footballers
Deportivo Cali footballers
Independiente Santa Fe footballers
Categoría Primera A players
Argentine Primera División players
Colombian expatriate sportspeople in Argentina
Expatriate footballers in Argentina